Jasper Weatherby (born January 22, 1998) is an American professional ice hockey player currently playing for the Grand Rapids Griffins of the American Hockey League (AHL), as a prospect to the Detroit Red Wings of the National Hockey League (NHL). He was selected by the San Jose Sharks in the 2018 NHL Entry Draft, and made his NHL debut in 2021.

Early life
Weatherby was born in Portland, Oregon to parents Richard Weatherby and Lucinda Moeglein. He comes from Jewish descent as his Jewish grandfather fled the Nazis from London, England. While both of his grandparents became civil right lawyers, his mother attended various civil rights protests during the Civil rights movement. Weatherby also grew up alongside his adopted brother Kevin, who the family took in when he was eight years old.

Playing career

BCHL
Although Weatherby was born in Portland, his family moved to a ranch in Ashland, Oregon when he was a toddler. He remained in Oregon until he was 14 years old when he left to play at the Canadian International Hockey Academy from 2012 to 2014. In his final season at the academy, a broken leg caused Weatherby to miss most of the 2014–15 season. From there, he spent two seasons with the Omaha AAA Lancers while attending Douglas County West High School but was unable to earn a long-term contract with several other junior teams upon graduating in 2016. Weatherby eventually earned a tryout with the Wenatchee Wild of the British Columbia Hockey League (BCHL) and played under coach Bliss Littler from 2016 to 2018. While playing under Littler, Weatherby helped lead the Wild to the 2018 BCHL Championship and a berth in the RBC Cup semifinals. In November 2017, Weatherby announce his commitment to join the North Dakota Fighting Hawks in the National Collegiate Hockey Conference (NCHC) in 2018.

Following his final season in the BCHL, Weatherby was ranked 198th amongst North American skaters by the NHL Central Scouting Bureau. Weatherby immediately enrolled in some University of North Dakota summer classes and began taking part in their offseason training program. He was eventually drafted by the San Jose Sharks in the fourth round, 102nd overall, of the 2018 NHL Entry Draft.

College
Following the draft, Weatherby played collegiate hockey with the North Dakota Fighting Hawks in the NCHC from 2018 to 2021 while majoring in marketing. In his first season with the Hawks, Weatherby registered three goals and two assists through 36 games. He tallied his first collegiate goal in a 6–2 loss to the Western Michigan Broncos on November 17, 2018. The Fighting Hawks finished 5th in the 8th place NCHC standings before being swept by Denver in the first round of the NCHC Playoffs.

Weatherby improved offensively during the shortened 2019–20 NCHC season and finished with 10 goals and eight assists through 35 games. By November 2019, Weatherby had collected two goals and two assists while also leading the team in faceoff win percentage through the first nine games of the season. His offensive talent helped lead the Fighting Hawks to the 2019 Penrose Cup as the NCHC's regular-season champions.

Professional
Following his Junior season, Weatherby concluded his collegiate career by signing a two-year entry-level contract with the Sharks on August 24, 2021 

In his first professional season, Weatherby made the  opening night roster with the Sharks. He made his NHL debut on October 16, 2021, in a 4–3 win over the Winnipeg Jets, where he also scored his first goal. In making an immediate impact with the Sharks, Weatherby added 5 goals and 11 points through 50 regular season games before finishing the season re-assigned to AHL affiliate, the San Jose Barracuda.

After attending the Sharks training camp in preparation for the  season, Weatherby failed to make the opening night roster and was assigned to continue his development in the AHL. Weatherby registered just 3 goals and 6 points through 39 games with the Barracuda before he was traded by the Sharks to the Detroit Red Wings in exchange for Kyle Criscuolo on January 18, 2023.

Career statistics

Awards and honours

References

External links

1999 births
Living people
American ice hockey centers
American ice hockey left wingers
Grand Rapids Griffins players
Ice hockey people from Oregon
North Dakota Fighting Hawks men's ice hockey players
San Jose Barracuda players
San Jose Sharks draft picks
San Jose Sharks players
Sportspeople from Portland, Oregon
Jewish ice hockey players
Jewish American sportspeople
21st-century American Jews